Kochwurst is the name given to the German pre-cooked sausage, a class of sausage whose ingredients are largely cooked before the preparation of the sausage meat. The individual ingredients are held together by solidified fat (as in Streichwürste or string sausages), gelatine (as in Sulz - cured meat in gelatine) or blood proteins coagulated by heating (as in Blutwurst or blood sausage). In contrast with cooked sausages (Brühwurst), Kochwurst does not remain solid on heating, but more or less liquefies. After being filled into intestines, jars or tins, the whole sausage is cooked through again in hot water or steam.

In addition to meat, Kochwurst often contains also offal like liver or tongue,  blood and, in the case of Grützwurst, cereal. Since the ingredients are easily perishable and Kochwurst does not usually last long, it was traditionally made on slaughtering days and is thus a usual ingredient of Schlachtplatte.

Also counted as Kochwurst are pies, known as Pasteten, which are cooked in square shapes. One speciality are Kochmettwürste such as the Palatine Saumagen, which are referred to as a type of Kochwurst.

In parts of northern Germany (e.g. in Schleswig-Holstein and Hamburg), the term Kochwurst is also used to refer to smoked Mettwurst and Kohlwurst, which is cooked in pots in order to be served as an accompaniment to Grünkohl, or to act as a soup ingredient.

Varieties 

In Germany, the Kochwurst varieties are grouped as follows (with examples):
Blutwurst
Beutelwurst
Gutsfleischwurst
Thüringer Rotwurst
Grützwurst
Fleischerblutwurst
Filetblutwurst
Hausmacherblutwurst
Schweinskopfblutwurst
Speckblutwurst
Leberrotwurst
Zungenblutwurst
Kochstreichwurst
Leberwurst
Kalbsleberwurst
Leberbrot
Pfälzer Leberwurst
Delikatessleberwurst
Einfache Leberwurst
Feine Leberwurst
Gutsleberwurst
Hausmacher Leberwurst
Kassler Leberwurst
Landleberwurst
Zwiebelleberwurst
Kochmettwurst
Gekochte Mettwurst
Hamburger Gekochte
Zwiebelwurst
Pinkel
Pastete
Sülzwurst
Schinkensülze
Presskopf
Corned Beef
Sächsische Weißwurst
Schwartenmagen
Schweinskopfsülzwurst
Sülzfleischwurst
Presswurst

See also

 List of sausages
 List of smoked foods

References

Sources 
Fleischverarbeitung, Berufsschullehrbuch, Leipzig 1978

External links 
Walter Wagner, Uni Bayreuth: Die Wurst

German sausages
Smoked meat
Precooked sausages